The Norwegian Post and Communications Union (POSTKOM) was a trade union representing workers in the postal and telecommunication sectors in Norway.

The union was formed in 2000 by the merger of the Norwegian Post Organisation and the Norwegian Union of Postmen.  Like both its predecessors, it affiliated to the Norwegian Confederation of Trade Unions (LO).

On 1 January 2020, the union merged into the Norwegian Union of Municipal and General Employees.  Throughout its history, the union was led by president Odd Christian Øverland.

References

External links

Norwegian Confederation of Trade Unions
Trade unions established in 2000
Trade unions disestablished in 2020
Postal trade unions